Roberto José Elías Orozco (born November 6, 1976, in León, Guanajuato) is a Mexican sport shooter. He won two bronze medals in both air and small-bore rifle at the 1999 Pan American Games in Winnipeg, Manitoba, Canada, and at the 2007 Pan American Games in Rio de Janeiro, Brazil, accumulating scores of 1,223.4 and 690.9 points, respectively. Elias also competed for his respective shooting events at the 2000 Summer Olympics in Sydney, and at the 2004 Summer Olympics in Athens, but he neither reached the final round, nor claimed an Olympic medal.

Eight years after competing in his first Olympics, Elias qualified for his third Mexican team, as a 31-year-old, at the 2008 Summer Olympics in Beijing, by obtaining a gold medal in the air rifle from the 2005 Championships of the Americas in Salinas, California. He scored a total of 590 targets in the men's 10 m air rifle, by one point ahead of South Korea's Han Jin-Seop from the final attempt, finishing only in twenty-fifth place.

Olympic results

References

External links
NBC 2008 Olympics profile

Mexican male sport shooters
Living people
Olympic shooters of Mexico
Shooters at the 2000 Summer Olympics
Shooters at the 2004 Summer Olympics
Shooters at the 2008 Summer Olympics
Shooters at the 2007 Pan American Games
Pan American Games bronze medalists for Mexico
Sportspeople from León, Guanajuato
1976 births
Pan American Games medalists in shooting
Medalists at the 2007 Pan American Games
21st-century Mexican people